Tule Springs Fossil Beds National Monument, a United States National Monument near Las Vegas, Clark County, Nevada, was established in 2014 to protect Ice Age paleontological discoveries. The  monument is administered by the National Park Service.

The national monument is located in the Upper Las Vegas Wash and protects part of the Tule Springs.  The wash area also includes several patches of the rare Las Vegas bear poppy. The land was designated after a local campaign to permanently protect the landscape as a national monument.

Paleontology
Paleontology studies began at Tule Springs in 1933 when the bones of a Columbian mammoth were discovered by quarry workers. Other fossils found at the site include Camelops, ground sloth, dire wolf, Teratornis, and American lion, and range from 7,000 to 250,000 years old.

Legislation
The Tule Springs Fossil Beds passed both houses of  Congress in December 2014 and signed into law by President Barack Obama on December 19, 2014, under Section 3092(a) of the National Defense Authorization Act for 2015.

See also
 List of national monuments of the United States

References

External links
 Tule Springs Fossil Beds National Monument
Photo gallery from the Monument, free Creative Commons photos.
 

Protected areas of Clark County, Nevada
Fossil parks in the United States
Cenozoic paleontological sites of North America
Paleontology in Nevada
2014 establishments in Nevada
Protected areas established in 2014
National Monuments designated by Barack Obama
National Park Service National Monuments in Nevada